Mala badal is part of the traditional Bengali Hindu wedding ceremony that involves the exchange of flower garlands between the bride and bridegroom, and is supposed to mark the first time when the bride and the bridegroom set eyes on each other. It is a ritual that is carried forward from the past, as the practice of not seeing each other before is hardly practised these days. Nevertheless, the mala badal marks the first time during the wedding that the bride and the groom are allowed to see each other.

The ceremony
In traditional Bengali Hindu wedding, the bridegroom comes to the girl's house to marry her, wearing a topor (headwear) and a Bengali-style dhoti and kurta, and is greeted, usually by the bride's mother along with other members of the family. After the bridegroom is seated at the canopied wedding altar (chadnatolla), he is offered new clothes as a gift from the bride. 

As the auspicious time approaches, 4-5 male members of the bride's family take her, seated on a low stool (pidi), circling round the groom seven times to symbolize that the bride and bridegroom are now "securely wound up to one another". Finally, the bride and bridegroom come face to face, and removing the two betel leaves covering her face all this while, make their first eye-contact, called Shubha Drishti. The two then exchange garlands, a ritual called "mala badal", amidst the blowing of conch shells and the sounding of "uloo dhani", while the purohit chants his mantras. The bride's paternal or maternal uncle then give her away in a ceremony is called Sampradan.

References

External links
 hinduism.about.com

Bengali culture